The Tao Te Ching is a Chinese classic text written around 400 BC and traditionally credited to the sage Laozi, though the text's authorship, date of composition and date of compilation are debated. The oldest excavated portion dates back to the late 4th century BC, but modern scholarship dates other parts of the text as having been written—or at least compiled—later than the earliest portions of the Zhuangzi.

The Tao Te Ching, along with the Zhuangzi, is a fundamental text for both philosophical and religious Taoism. It also strongly influenced other schools of Chinese philosophy and religion, including Legalism, Confucianism, and Chinese Buddhism, which was largely interpreted through the use of Taoist words and concepts when it was originally introduced to China. Many artists, including poets, painters, calligraphers, and gardeners, have used the Tao Te Ching as a source of inspiration.  Its influence has spread widely within the globe's artistic and academic spheres. It is one of the most translated texts in world literature.

Title 
In English, the title is commonly rendered Tao Te Ching , following Wade–Giles romanisation, or Dao De Jing , following pinyin. The Tao Te Ching can be translated as The Classic of the Way and its Power, The Book of the Tao and Its Virtue, The Book of the Way and of Virtue, The Tao and its Characteristics, The Canon of Reason and Virtue, The Classic Book of Integrity and the Way, or A Treatise on the Principle and Its Action.

Ancient Chinese books were commonly referenced by the name of their real or supposed author, in this case the "Old Master", Laozi. As such, the Tao Te Ching is also sometimes referred to as the Laozi, especially in Chinese sources.

The title "Daodejing", with its status as a classic, was only first applied from the reign of Emperor Jing of Han (157–141 BC) onward. Other titles of the work include the honorific "Sutra (or "Perfect Scripture") of the Way and Its Power" (Daode Zhenjing) and the descriptive "5,000-Character Classic" (Wuqian Wen).

Text
The Tao Te Ching has a long and complex textual history. Known versions and commentaries date back two millennia, including ancient bamboo, silk, and paper manuscripts discovered in the twentieth century.

Internal structure
The Tao Te Ching is a text of around 5,000 Chinese characters in 81 brief chapters or sections. There is some evidence that the chapter divisions were later additions—for commentary, or as aids to rote memorisation—and that the original text was more fluidly organised. It has two parts, the Tao Ching (chapters 1–37) and the Te Ching (chapters 38–81), which may have been edited together into the received text, possibly reversed from an original Te Tao Ching. The written style is laconic, has few grammatical particles, and encourages varied, contradictory interpretations. The ideas are singular; the style poetic. The rhetorical style combines two major strategies: short, declarative statements and intentional contradictions. The first of these strategies creates memorable phrases, while the second forces the reader to reconcile supposed contradictions.

The Chinese characters in the original versions were probably written in zhuànshū (篆書 seal script), while later versions were written in lìshū (隸書 clerical script) and kǎishū (楷書 regular script) styles.

Historical authenticity of the author 
The Tao Te Ching is ascribed to Laozi, whose historical existence has been a matter of scholarly debate. His name, which means "Old Master", has only fuelled controversy on this issue.

The first reliable reference to Laozi is his "biography" in the Records of the Grand Historian (63, tr. Chan 1963:35–37), by Chinese historian Sima Qian, which combines three stories. In the first, Laozi was a contemporary of Confucius (551–479 BC). His surname was Li, and his personal name was Er or Dan. He was an official in the imperial archives, and wrote a book in two parts before departing to the West; at the request of the keeper of the Han-ku Pass, Yinxi, Laozi composed the Tao Te Ching. In the second story, Laozi, also a contemporary of Confucius, was Lao Laizi, who wrote a book in 15 parts. Third, Laozi was the grand historian and astrologer Lao Dan, who lived during the reign (384–362 BC) of Duke Xian of Qin.

Generations of scholars have debated the historicity of Laozi and the dating of the Tao Te Ching. Linguistic studies of the text's vocabulary and rhyme scheme point to a date of composition after the Shijing yet before the Zhuangzi. Legends claim variously that Laozi was "born old" and that he lived for 996 years, with twelve previous incarnations starting around the time of the Three Sovereigns before the thirteenth as Laozi. Some Western scholars have expressed doubts over Laozi's historical existence.

Many Taoists venerate Laozi as Daotsu, the founder of the school of Dao, the Daode Tianzun in the Three Pure Ones, and one of the eight elders transformed from Taiji in the Chinese creation myth.

The predominant view among scholars today is that the text is a compilation or anthology representing multiple authors. The current text might have been compiled , drawn from a wide range of texts dating back a century or two.

Principal versions
Among the many transmitted editions of the Tao Te Ching text, the three primary ones are named after early commentaries. The "Yan Zun Version", which is only extant for the Te Ching, derives from a commentary attributed to Han dynasty scholar Yan Zun (fl. 80 BC – 10 AD). The "Heshang Gong Version" is named after the legendary Heshang Gong ( "Riverside Sage") who supposedly lived during the reign (180–157 BC) of Emperor Wen of Han. This commentary has a preface written by Ge Xuan (164–244 AD), granduncle of Ge Hong, and scholarship dates this version to around the 3rd century AD. The "Wang Bi Version" has more verifiable origins than either of the above. Wang Bi (226–249 AD) was a Three Kingdoms period philosopher and commentator on the Tao Te Ching and the I Ching.

Tao Te Ching scholarship has advanced from archaeological discoveries of manuscripts, some of which are older than any of the received texts. Beginning in the 1920s and 1930s, Marc Aurel Stein and others found thousands of scrolls in the Mogao Caves near Dunhuang. They included more than 50 partial and complete "Tao Te Ching" manuscripts. One written by the scribe So/Su Dan (素統) is dated 270 AD and corresponds closely with the Heshang Gong version. Another partial manuscript has the Xiang'er commentary, which had previously been lost.

Mawangdui and Guodian texts
In 1973, archaeologists discovered copies of early Chinese books, known as the Mawangdui Silk Texts, in a tomb dating from 168 BC. They included two nearly complete copies of the text, referred to as Text A and Text B, both of which reverse the traditional ordering and put the Te Ching section before the Tao Ching, which is why the Henricks translation of them is named "Te-Tao Ching". Based on calligraphic styles and imperial naming taboo avoidances, scholars believe that Text A can be dated to about the first decade and Text B to about the third decade of the 2nd century BC.

In 1993, the oldest known version of the text, written on bamboo slips, was found in a tomb near the town of Guodian in Jingmen, Hubei, and dated prior to 300 BC. The Guodian Chu Slips comprise about 800 slips of bamboo with a total of over 13,000 characters, about 2,000 of which correspond with the Tao Te Ching.

Both the Mawangdui and Guodian versions are generally consistent with the received texts, excepting differences in chapter sequence and graphic variants. Several recent Tao Te Ching translations utilise these two versions, sometimes with the verses reordered to synthesize the new finds.

Themes 

The text concerns itself with the Dao (or "Way"), and how it is expressed by virtue (de). Specifically, the text emphasises the virtues of naturalness (ziran) and non-action (wuwei).

Versions and translations 
The Tao Te Ching has been translated into Western languages over 250 times, mostly to English, German, and French. According to Holmes Welch, "It is a famous puzzle which everyone would like to feel he had solved." The first English translation of the Tao Te Ching was produced in 1868 by the Scottish Protestant missionary John Chalmers, entitled The Speculations on Metaphysics, Polity, and Morality of the "Old Philosopher" Lau-tsze. It was heavily indebted to Julien's French translation and dedicated to James Legge, who later produced his own translation for Oxford's Sacred Books of the East.

Other notable English translations of the Tao Te Ching are those produced by Chinese scholars and teachers: a 1948 translation by linguist Lin Yutang, a 1961 translation by author John Ching Hsiung Wu, a 1963 translation by sinologist Din Cheuk Lau, another 1963 translation by professor Wing-tsit Chan, and a 1972 translation by Taoist teacher Gia-Fu Feng together with his wife Jane English.

Many translations are written by people with a foundation in Chinese language and philosophy who are trying to render the original meaning of the text as faithfully as possible into English. Some of the more popular translations are written from a less scholarly perspective, giving an individual author's interpretation. Critics of these versions claim that their translators deviate from the text and are incompatible with the history of Chinese thought. Russell Kirkland goes further to argue that these versions are based on Western Orientalist fantasies and represent the colonial appropriation of Chinese culture. Other Taoism scholars, such as Michael LaFargue and Jonathan Herman, argue that while they do not pretend to scholarship, they meet a real spiritual need in the West. These Westernized versions aim to make the wisdom of the Tao Te Ching more accessible to modern English-speaking readers by, typically, employing more familiar cultural and temporal references.

Translational difficulties 

The Tao Te Ching is written in Classical Chinese, which poses a number of challenges to complete comprehension. As Holmes Welch notes, the written language "has no active or passive, no singular or plural, no case, no person, no tense, no mood." Moreover, the received text lacks many grammatical particles which are preserved in the older Mawangdui and Beida texts, which permit the text to be more precise. Lastly, many passages of the Tao Te Ching are deliberately vague and ambiguous.

Since there are no punctuation marks in Classical Chinese, it can be difficult to conclusively determine where one sentence ends and the next begins. Moving a full-stop a few words forward or back or inserting a comma can profoundly alter the meaning of many passages, and such divisions and meanings must be determined by the translator. Some editors and translators argue that the received text is so corrupted (from originally being written on one-line bamboo strips linked with silk threads) that it is impossible to understand some chapters without moving sequences of characters from one place to another.

Notable translations 

 
 
 .
 
 .
 
 
 
 
 
 
 .
 
 .
 .
 Addiss, Stephen and Lombardo, Stanley (1991) Tao Te Ching, Indianapolis/Cambridge: Hackett Publishing Company.
 .
 Chad Hansen, Laozi: Tao Te Ching  on The Art of Harmony, Duncan Baird Publications 2009
 Sinedino, Giorgio (2015), Dao De Jing (in Portuguese), São Paulo: Editora Unesp

See also

 Daozang
 Bogar
 Ecclesiastes
 Huahujing
 Huainanzi
 Huangdi Yinfujing
 Liezi
 Qingjing Jing
 Sanhuangjing
 Straw dog
 Taiping Jing
 Xishengjing
 Zhuangzi
 Wenzi
 Four Books and Five Classics

Notes

References

Citations

Sources 

 Ariel, Yoav, and Gil Raz. "Anaphors or Cataphors? A Discussion of the Two qi 其 Graphs in the First Chapter of the Daodejing." PEW 60.3 (2010): 391–421
 .
 .
 Cole, Alan, "Simplicity for the Sophisticated: ReReading the Daode Jing for the Polemics of Ease and Innocence," in History of Religions, August 2006, pp. 1–49
 Damascene, Hieromonk, Lou Shibai, and You-Shan Tang. Christ the Eternal Tao. Platina, CA: Saint Herman Press, 1999.
 
 Kaltenmark, Max. Lao Tzu and Taoism. Translated by Roger Greaves. Stanford: Stanford University Press. 1969.
 Klaus, Hilmar Das Tao der Weisheit. Laozi-Daodejing. English + German introduction, 140 p. bibliogr., 3 German transl. Aachen: Mainz 2008, 548 p.
 Klaus, Hilmar The Tao of Wisdom. Laozi-Daodejing. Chinese-English-German. 2 verbatim + 2 analogous transl., 140 p. bibl., Aachen: Mainz 2009 600p.
 .
 Komjathy, Louis. Handbooks for Daoist Practice. 10 vols. Hong Kong: Yuen Yuen Institute, 2008.
 .

External links 

 
Daodejing Wang Bi edition with English translation, Guodian text, and Mawangdui text – Chinese Text Project
 
Legge, Suzuki, and Goddard's translations side-by-side, along with the original text
 Dàodéjīng verbatim + analogous + poetic; Chinese + English + German by Hilmar Alquiros  Lǎozǐ 

Chinese classic texts
Ancient Chinese philosophical literature
Classical Chinese philosophy
Philosophy books
Taoist texts
Works of unknown authorship
Laozi